German baked apples are a German dish of baked apples traditionally made with the Dutch Belle de Boskoop apple. They can be prepared with many different fillings and are a common Christmas dish. Often they are served with vanilla custard.

Background
Apples are the most widely grown fruit in Germany, used to prepare many dishes and beverages in German cuisine. Apples were the only locally grown fruit in Germany that kept during the winter months, which made baked apples an economical choice for holiday desserts in the Christmas traditions of Germany or as a sweet main dish in cold weather.

Preparation
The whole apples once cored can be stuffed with assorted fillings made from chopped almonds, marzipan, raisins, rum, butter, lemon juice, sugar, spices and other ingredients. Some versions are baked in a baking dish with white wine and honey and baked until tender. They are usually served with vanilla custard or ice cream.

Apples can be baked on top of a wood stove or in the oven in round enamel cast iron dishes called "apple schnitzers". The dish has a spike in the center that cooks the cored apple from the inside out. Schnitzers may be a German invention, no longer widely used in Germany, but still found among Amish communities in the United States.

See also
Lebkuchen
List of apple dishes
Springerle
Stollen

References

Apple dishes
Baked foods
Christmas food
Christmas in Germany
German desserts
Stuffed desserts